The MOKE is a recreational vehicle manufactured by Chery Automobile in China since 2013 and assembled by a variety of companies in the United States, United Kingdom, France, and others. The design, by British industrial designer Michael Young, evokes the classic Mini Moke built from 1964 until 1993. The name "Mini Moke" combines Mini with Moke, an archaic term for mule.  The new version is simply called "MOKE".

The original Mini Moke was conceived and manufactured as a lightweight military vehicle by British Motor Corporation (BMC), and subsequently marketed for civilian use by that company's various successor companies and subsidiaries. It was known for its simple, straightforward, doorless design, and for its adaptability. While the original design was also sold for utility purposes, the new Moke is mainly meant for recreational use, as a beach car, or as a neighborhood vehicle. 

The MOKE revival began as a joint venture with Jaguar Land Rover and Chinese automaker Chery Automobile. MOKE America distributes the Moke in the United States. British production by MOKE International restarted in 2018. The brand was acquired by EV Technology Group in 2022.

History
The original Mini Moke was designed by Sir Alec Issigonis and John Sheppard. The more rugged Mini Moke was an attempt to take a portion of the military vehicle business from Land Rover, but poor ground clearance and a low-powered engine did not meet the most basic requirements for an off-road vehicle.

The Mini Moke entered production nonetheless, as a utility and recreational convertible for private use under the Austin, Morris and Leyland brands. The Mini Moke was built in Australia from 1966 until 1981, and was then gradually moved to British Leyland's Portuguese subsidiary beginning in 1980. Italian motorcycle manufacturers Cagiva took over the rights to the Portuguese operation in 1990 and built the Moke there (styled "MOKE" without "Mini" in the name) in small numbers until 1993. Various companies have built replicas and recreations over the years; the car's simple design has also allowed enthusiasts to create entire new Mokes from parts.

Revival

In 2013, Chery Automobile began manufacturing the Moke in China. This evocation was designed by industrial designer Michael Young and several companies in the United Kingdom, France, and the United States assemble the Chery-made car locally. The local assemblers also use locally sourced parts like glass, tires, and electrical engines to various degrees.

The last petrol powered Moke was sold at the Blenheim Palace Ball auction in 2022. The proceeds of the event were donated to the charity Starlight UK.

Electric versions

Since 2014, an electric version of this design has been assembled in France under the name "Nosmoke". Built by a company called Nosmoke S.A.S., they originally operated out of the old Heuliez plant in Cerizay but later relocated to an old printing plant in the same town. Nosmoke has also developed a 2-seater box truck version with a closed cabin called the Truckï, which is set to enter production in 2023. An Electric Moke (styled "eMoke") low-speed vehicle based on the Chinese MOKE has been assembled in the United States by Cruise Car Inc. for MOKE America since 2017. It uses a mix of Chinese-made and locally sourced parts. An electric E-Moke built in France was also offered for a few years, but production moved to Britain in 2021. In 2021, a second electric version based on this design was launched, with a limited-edition US highway certified version called "MOKE Californian" following in 2022.

In 2022, Moke International agreed to a takeover by EV Technology Group (EVTG). The Canadian electric transportation company bought 67 percent of the shares, with an option to increase this to full ownership. In a related purchase, EV Technology Group also purchased 76 percent of Fablink, which manufactures the e-Moke electric vehicle, with an option to acquire the remainder of the company.

Design

The MOKE has a front subframe and other mechanical items such as the front strut suspension and transmission adapted from Chery's other cars. The engine is a 1.1-liter,  four-cylinder unit built by Chery subsidiary Acteco Powertrain and commonly seen across a wide range of Chinese-built compacts and subcompacts. The Chinese drivetrain has necessitated a larger front end with a much more substantial front overhang than the original Mini Moke's Alec Issigonis design allowed.

Aside from the petrol-powered version, numerous electric versions have also been developed by local assemblers.

References

MOKE
Subcompact cars
Mini sport utility vehicles
Low-speed vehicles
Convertibles
Production electric cars
Front-wheel-drive vehicles
Cars introduced in 2013
2020s cars

Notes

External links

 Moke America official
 Moke France official (Kate)
 Moke International official